Shenga Bjemi Gewog (Dzongkha: ཤེལ་རྔ་_སྦྱེ་མི་) is a gewog (village block) of Punakha District, Bhutan.

References

Gewogs of Bhutan
Punakha District